New Aryankavu (Code: AYVN) is a new railway station opened on Kollam–Sengottai railway line connecting Kollam district in Kerala with Tirunelveli district in Tamil Nadu, during the year 2018. The station is also known as Palaruvi railway station as the station lies very close to the famous Palaruvi Falls in Kollam district.

Relevance
So the team identified a suitable site for a new railway station with the gradient of 1 in 400 that can accommodate a broad-gauge yard in future. Around 330 trees were cut down to build the New Aryankavu railway station

See also

References

New Aryankavu
Madurai railway division
2018 establishments in Kerala
Railway stations in India opened in 2018